Michael Mike Quinn is an Australian Paralympic  athletics, swimming and snooker competitor.

In 1972, at the age of 19, a car accident left him a quadriplegic.  Before the accident, he played in the Brisbane schoolboy rugby union team and was junior belt champion for the Bribie Island Surf Life Saving Club. While he was in hospital, Roy Fowler, an Australian Paralympian was in the bed next to him having his kidney removed. Fowler encouraged him to stay involved in sport. Nine months after the accident, he was competing in wheelchair sports events.

He competed at the 1984 Stoke Mandeville Games in athletics and swimming.  He won a silver medal in the athletics Men's 4 × 200 m 1A-1C and bronze medals in athletics Men's 4 × 100 m Relay 1A-1C, Men's Slalom IB,  and swimming Men's 3 x 25m Freestyle Relay 1A-1C.  After the Games, he dedicated himself to snooker as it was the only sport that allowed him to compete against able-bodied people. He competed in snooker at the 1988 Seoul Paralympics. In 1992, he was selected in the first Australian wheelchair rugby team to compete in an international tournament.

References 

Paralympic athletes of Australia
Male Paralympic swimmers of Australia
Paralympic snooker players of Australia
Athletes (track and field) at the 1984 Summer Paralympics
Swimmers at the 1984 Summer Paralympics
Snooker players at the 1988 Summer Paralympics
Paralympic gold medalists for Australia
Paralympic bronze medalists for Australia
Living people
Paralympic silver medalists for Australia
Australian male wheelchair racers
Year of birth missing (living people)
Medalists at the 1984 Summer Paralympics
Paralympic medalists in athletics (track and field)
Paralympic medalists in swimming
Australian male freestyle swimmers